re-Foc is the first widely available album by Mexican guitar duo Rodrigo y Gabriela, released in 2002. Some songs are re-recorded versions of those that appeared on Foc, a 9-track demo put together by the band in April/May 2001. The demo was "recorded at home, without microphones - everything was played through the guitar pick-ups. This meant that some of the percussion on the strings sounded very quiet". Others were written for the album, which features contributions from the violinist Zoë Conway and bodhrán player and percussionist Robbie Harris.

Track listing

Some editions list the last track as "Sangre y Ritmo" instead of "Temple Bar".

Track 6 contains an excerpt of "Blitzkrieg" (Blitzkrieg).

Personnel
Rodrigo y Gabriela
Rodrigo Sánchez – acoustic guitar, cymbals, hi-hats, shakers
Gabriela Quintero – acoustic guitar

Additional performers
Zoë Conway – violin, vocals
Robbie Harris – percussion, bongos, shakers, cymbals, bodhrán
Johnny Daly – double bass
Claudia Chambers – cajón
Aran O'Malley – cymbals

Production
Produced by Rodrigo y Gabriela
Mixed by Alberto Pinto, except "Temple Bar", mixed by Fionan De Barra
Mastered by Robyn Robins
Art direction, design, and fire photography by Marcus Byrne
Photography by Cormac Scully

References

External links
 Official site

2003 albums
Rodrigo y Gabriela albums